Adrianovka is a rural locality (a khutor) in Karayashnikovskoye Rural Settlement, Olkhovatsky District, Voronezh Oblast, Russia. The population was 118 as of 2010. There are 2 streets.

Geography 
Adrianovka is located 24 km north of Olkhovatka (the district's administrative centre) by road. Rybny is the nearest rural locality.

References 

Rural localities in Olkhovatsky District